Sarongk is a khum (commune) of Svay Chek District in Banteay Meanchey Province in north-western Cambodia.

Villages

 Pheas Tboung (ភូមិភាសត្បូង)
 Pheas Cheung
 Chrung
 Phlas Kang
 Kouk Phlu
 Kantrong

References

Communes of Banteay Meanchey province
Svay Chek District